Jodi Arias: Dirty Little Secret is a 2013 American made-for-television drama film about the murder of Travis Alexander. Directed by Jace Alexander and executive produced by Joshua D. Maurer and Alixandre Witlin and Judith Verno, the film focused on Jodi Arias, who was convicted of murdering Travis Alexander. Created for and distributed by the Lifetime Network in association with City Entertainment and Silver Screen Pictures, the film premiered June 22, 2013.

Production 
City Entertainment's Maurer and Witlin originally sold the project to Lifetime, which began consideration of the film as early as March 2012, eight months before the trial commenced, and began shooting it even as the trial was underway. A March 2013 report by Fox News shared that pre-production and casting were underway at that time, filming was to begin at Los Angeles locations in April, and actress Tania Raymonde had been selected to play the role of Jodi Arias.

Filming of the project began while the Maricopa County, Arizona trial was still ongoing, and concluded after the trial's May 8, 2013 first degree murder verdict for defendant Jodi Arias. The film's courtroom scenes were shot two days after the trial's conclusion, with portions of the original script rewritten to include key moments excerpted from case's final proceedings.

Storyline 
The film follows the prosecution's timeline of events, and while some of the film's dialog is taken word-for-word from actual court transcripts, only the last five minutes of the film are dedicated to the courtroom scenes. The bulk of the film revolves around the love affair between Jodi Arias (Tania Raymonde) and Travis Alexander (Jesse Lee Soffer), the man she was convicted of murdering.

Cast 

 Tania Raymonde as Jodi Arias
 Jesse Lee Soffer as Travis Alexander
 David Zayas as Detective Esteban Flores
 Leah Pipes as Katie
 Zane Holtz as Nick
 Tony Plana as Prosecutor Juan Martinez
 Debra Mooney as Caroline
 Jace Alexander as Boss
 Meredith Salenger as Willmott
 Jeff Howard as Paul
 Makinna Ridgway as Helen
 Kimberly Whalen as Angela
 Cynthia Addai-Robinson as Leslie
 Fernando Aldaz as Guy
 Jen Oda as Lab Tech

Critical response 
The film met with both mixed and positive reviews from critics, with a score of 53 out of 100 from Metacritic. According to Nielsen Research as reported by Broadway World, in its averaging 3.1 million viewers on its premiere, the "film ranks as this year's #2 original cable movie". Geoff Berkshire of Variety says the movie, while unabashed exploitation, makes no apologies. Randy Cordova of The Arizona Republic says the movie was great, but felt it was too soon to make a film based on the murder. In USA Today, Cordova found that through "smart direction" the film was "better than expected", and praised the lead actor's performances as "sensitive and layered." People offered that the film did not unearth anything new about the murder case but was fine entertainment. They wrote it was "a pretty good film. It's a draw-you-in, sudsy melodrama stocked with guilty pleasures: romance, sex, obsession, betrayal and vengeance."

References

External links 
 Official website
 Jodi Arias: Dirty Little Secret at Internet Movie Database

2013 television films
2013 films
2013 crime drama films
American crime drama films
Drama films based on actual events
Films scored by Gregor Narholz
Films about murderers
Films set in Arizona
Films set in the 2000s
Films shot in Los Angeles
Lifetime (TV network) films
Crime films based on actual events
Films scored by Erran Baron Cohen
American drama television films
2010s English-language films
2010s American films